The 1916–17 Illinois Fighting Illini men's basketball team represented the University of Illinois.

Regular season
The 1916–17 season was the second Big Ten Conference championship for the Illinois Fighting Illini men's basketball team.  Coached by Ralph Jones, the Illini continued their winning ways by finishing the season with an overall record of 13 wins and 3 losses and a 10 win 2 loss conference mark.  The starting lineup included E. G. McKay, J. B. Felmley and Ralf Woods rotating at the forward position, captain and center C. G. Alwood, and guards George Halas and Ray Woods.  Woods was named the Helms Foundation College Basketball Player of the Year for his work during this season.

Roster

Source

Schedule
												
Source																

|-	
!colspan=12 style="background:#DF4E38; color:white;"| Non-Conference regular season
|- align="center" bgcolor=""

			

|-	
!colspan=9 style="background:#DF4E38; color:#FFFFFF;"|Big Ten regular season

Bold Italic connotes conference game

Player stats

Awards and honors
Ray Woods was elected to the "Illini Men's Basketball All-Century Team" in 2004. Woods was also selected as the Helms Foundation College Basketball Player of the Year for the 1916–17 season.

Clyde Alwood was named a Consensus All-American for the 1916-17 season.

George Halas was enshrined in the Pro Football Hall of Fame (1963), for his role in the development of the National Football League as well as for his coaching and playing for the Chicago Bears.

References

Illinois Fighting Illini
Illinois Fighting Illini men's basketball seasons
1916 in sports in Illinois
1917 in sports in Illinois